Overlander Mountain is a summit in British Columbia, Canada.

Description 

Overlander Mountain, elevation 2,687-meters (8,816-feet), is located in Mount Robson Provincial Park, just south and within view of the park's visitor centre. It is the sixth-highest peak in the Selwyn Range, which is a subrange of the Canadian Rockies. Precipitation runoff from the peak drains into tributaries of the Fraser River. The Yellowhead Highway (Highway 16) and Canadian National Railway traverse around the northern base of the mountain. Views from the summit include Robson Valley, Cinnamon Peak, Whitehorn Mountain, Mount Robson, Resplendent Mountain, and many other peaks. The nearest neighbor is Klapperhorn Mountain,  to the northwest.

History
The mountain's toponym was adopted by British Columbia on March 13, 1972, and officially adopted January 30, 1980, by the Geographical Names Board of Canada. The mountain and nearby Overlander Falls are named for the Overlanders expedition of 1862 which made part of their perilous journey through the valley beneath this peak. "The Overlanders", a group of 175 men and one woman led by Thomas McMicking, travelled from Ontario across the prairies and through the Rocky Mountains, intending to reach the Cariboo goldfields.

Climate

Based on the Köppen climate classification, Overlander Mountain is located in a subarctic climate zone with cold, snowy winters, and mild summers. Winter temperatures can drop below −20 °C with wind chill factors below −30 °C.

See also
 
 Geography of British Columbia

References

External links
Mount Robson Provincial Park website—BC Parks
 Overlander Mountain: weather forecast
 Overlanders of 1862: Thecanadianencyclopedia.ca

Canadian Rockies
Two-thousanders of British Columbia
Robson Valley
Cariboo Land District
Mount Robson Provincial Park